United States environmental law concerns legal standards to protect human health and improve the natural environment of the United States. While subject to criticism at home and abroad on issues of protection, enforcement, and over-regulation, the country remains an important source of environmental legal expertise and experience.

Scope 

The United States Congress has enacted federal statutes intended to address pollution control and remediation, including for example the Clean Air Act (air pollution), the Clean Water Act (water pollution), and the Comprehensive Environmental Response, Compensation, and Liability Act (CERCLA, or Superfund) (contaminated site cleanup). There are also federal laws governing natural resources use and biodiversity which are strongly influenced by environmental principles, including the Endangered Species Act, National Forest Management Act, and Coastal Zone Management Act. The National Environmental Policy Act, governing environmental impact review in actions undertaken or approved by the U.S. federal government, may implicate all of these areas.

Federalism in the United States has played a role in the shape of national environmental legislation. Many federal environmental laws employ cooperative federalism mechanisms - many federal regulatory programs are administered in coordination with the U.S. states. Furthermore, the states generally have enacted their own laws to cover areas not preempted by federal law. This includes areas where Congress had acted in limited fashion (e.g., state site cleanup laws to handle sites outside Superfund) and where Congress has left regulation primarily to the states (e.g., water resources law).

History

The history of environmental law in the US can be traced back to early roots in common law doctrines, for example, the law of nuisance and the public trust doctrine. The first environmental statute was the Rivers and Harbors Act of 1899, which has been largely superseded by the Clean Water Act (CWA). However, most current major environmental statutes, such as the federal statutes listed above, were passed in the time spanning the late 1960s through the early 1980s.  Prior to the passage of these statutes, most federal environmental laws were not nearly as comprehensive.

Silent Spring, a 1962 book by Rachel Carson, is frequently credited as launching the environmental movement in the United States.  The book documented the effects of pesticides, especially DDT, on birds and other wildlife. Among the most significant environmental disasters of the 1960s was the 1969 Santa Barbara oil spill, which generated considerable public outrage as Congress was considering several major pieces of environmental legislation. (See Environmental movement in the United States.)

One lawsuit that has been widely recognized as one of the earliest environmental cases is Scenic Hudson Preservation Conference v. Federal Power Commission, decided in 1965 by the Second Circuit Court of Appeals, prior to passage of the major federal environmental statutes. The case helped halt the construction of a power plant on Storm King Mountain in New York State.  The case has been described as giving birth to environmental litigation and helping create the legal doctrine of standing to bring environmental claims. The Scenic Hudson case also is said to have helped inspire the passage of the National Environmental Policy Act (NEPA), and the creation of such environmental advocacy groups as the Natural Resources Defense Council.

Legal sources 
Laws from every stratum of the laws of the United States pertain to environmental issues.  Congress has passed a number of landmark environmental regulatory regimes, but many other federal laws are equally important, if less comprehensive. Concurrently, the legislatures of the fifty states have passed innumerable comparable sets of laws.  These state and federal systems are foliated with layer upon layer of administrative regulation. Meanwhile, the US judicial system reviews not only the legislative enactments, but also the administrative decisions of the many agencies dealing with environmental issues.  Where the statutes and regulations end, the common law begins.

Federal statutes

Federal regulation 
Consistent with the federal statutes that they administer, US federal agencies promulgate regulations in the Code of Federal Regulations that fill out the broad programs enacted by Congress.  Primary among these is Title 40 of the Code of Federal Regulations, containing the regulations of the Environmental Protection Agency (EPA). Other important CFR sections include Title 10 (energy), Title 18 (Conservation of Power and Water Resources), Title 21 (Food and Drugs), Title 33 (Navigable Waters), Title 36 (Parks, Forests and Public Property), Title 43 (Public Lands: Interior) and Title 50 (Wildlife and Fisheries).

Judicial decisions 

The federal and state judiciaries have played an important role in the development of environmental law in the United States, in many cases resolving significant controversy regarding the application of federal environmental laws in favor of environmental interests.  The decisions of the Supreme Court in cases such as Calvert Cliffs Coordinating Committee v. U.S. Atomic Energy Commission (broadly reading the procedural requirements of NEPA), Tennessee Valley Authority v. Hill (broadly reading the Endangered Species Act), and, much more recently, Massachusetts v. EPA (requiring EPA to reconsider regulation of greenhouse gases under the Clean Air Act) have had policy impacts far beyond the facts of the particular case.

Common law 
The common law of tort is an important tool for the resolution of environmental disputes that fall beyond the confines of regulated activity.  Prior to the modern proliferation of environmental regulation, the doctrines of nuisance (public or private), trespass, negligence, and strict liability apportioned harm and assigned liability for activities that today would be considered pollution and likely governed by regulatory regimes.  These doctrines remain relevant, and most recently have been used by plaintiffs seeking to impose liability for the consequences of global climate change.

The common law also continues to play a leading role in American water law, in the doctrines of riparian rights and prior appropriation.

Administration 

In the United States, responsibilities for the administration of environmental laws are divided between numerous federal and state agencies with varying, overlapping, and sometimes conflicting missions.  EPA is the most well-known federal agency, with jurisdiction over many of the country's national air, water and waste and hazardous substance programs. Other federal agencies, such as the U.S. Fish and Wildlife Service and National Park Service pursue primarily conservation missions, while still others, such as the United States Forest Service and the Bureau of Land Management, tend to focus more on beneficial use of natural resources.

Federal agencies operate within the limits of federal jurisdiction. For example, EPA's jurisdiction under the Clean Water Act is limited to "waters of the United States". In many cases federal laws allow for more stringent regulation by states, and of transfer of certain federally mandated responsibilities from federal to state control. US state governments, therefore, administering state law adopted under state police powers or federal law by delegation, uniformly include environmental agencies. The extent to which state environmental laws are based on or depart from federal law varies from jurisdiction to jurisdiction.

Thus, while a permit to fill non-federal wetlands might require a permit from a single state agency, larger and more complex endeavors—for example, the construction of a coal-fired power plant—might require approvals from numerous federal and state agencies.

Enforcement 
In the United States, violations of environmental laws are generally civil offenses, resulting in monetary penalties and, perhaps, civil sanctions such as injunction. Many environmental laws also provide for criminal penalties for egregious violations. Some federal laws, such as the Clean Water Act, also allow a U.S. citizen to file a lawsuit against a violator, if the government has failed to take enforcement action.

Environmental agencies often include separate enforcement offices, with duties including monitoring permitted activities, performing compliance inspections, issuing citations and prosecuting wrongdoing (civilly or criminally, depending on the violation). EPA's Office of Enforcement and Compliance Assurance is one such agency. Others, such as the United States Park Police, carry out more traditional law enforcement activities.

Adjudicatory proceedings for environmental violations are often handled by the agencies themselves under the structures of administrative law. In some cases, appeals are also handled internally (for example, EPA's Environmental Appeals Board).  Generally, final agency determinations may subsequently be appealed to the appropriate court.

As environmental law becomes more widespread in the United States, another form of enforcement is emerging. Economic sanctions and incentives are the next wave of enforcement techniques. However, other researchers believe that the best way to enforce environmental regulation is to enforce non-environmental laws that can also have positive results for the environment. Some researchers have found that this leads to better environmental performance with bipartisan support

Education and training 
U.S. News & World Report has consistently ranked Lewis & Clark Law School, The Elisabeth Haub School of Law at Pace University, and the Vermont Law School in the top 5 of its list of Environmental Law programs in the United States.

Environmental law courses are offered as elective courses in the second and third years of JD study at many American law schools.  Curricula vary: an introductory course might focus on the "big five" federal statutes—NEPA, Clean Air Act, CWA, CERCLA (Superfund) and Resource Conservation and Recovery Act (or, alternatively, the Federal Insecticide, Fungicide, and Rodenticide Act)—and may be offered in conjunction with a natural resources law course.  Smaller seminars may be offered on more focused topics.  Some US law schools also offer an LLM or JSD specialization in environmental law. Additionally, several law schools host legal clinics that focus on environmental law, providing students with an opportunity to learn about environmental law in the context of real world disputes involving actual clients.

International environmental lawyers often receive specialized training in the form of an LL.M. degree at US institutions, after having a first law degreeoften in another country from where they got their first law degree.

Environmental protection

Water
EI duPont de Nemours & Co. v. Train, 
Friends of the Earth, Inc. v. Laidlaw Environmental Services, Inc. (2000)
Rapanos v. United States, 547 U.S. 715 (2006)
County of Maui v. Hawaii Wildlife Fund (2020)

Air pollution
Union Elec. Co. v. EPA, 
Chevron USA v. Natural Resources Defense Council, 
Massachusetts v. Environmental Protection Agency,

See also
US administrative law
Environmental policy of the United States
Energy policy of the United States
US corporate law

Notes

External links
US Environmental Protection Agency 
Environmental Law Institute 
History of Scenic Hudson -  the advocacy group which brought the landmark case Scenic Hudson Preservation Conference v. Federal Power Commission
Excerpt from "The Birth of Environmentalism" by Robert E. Taylor
Federal Environmental Protection Bills - GovTrack.us (GovTrack)

fr:Politique environnementale des États-Unis